The Dominion Line was a trans-atlantic passenger line founded in 1870 as the Liverpool & Mississippi Steamship Co., with the official name being changed in 1872 to the Mississippi & Dominion Steamship Co Ltd. The firm was amalgamated in 1902 into the International Mercantile Marine Co.

20th Century
After 1908, the passenger service was operated under the name "White Star-Dominion Line" and in 1926 the Dominion Line company was wound up completely, except in the West Indies, with the service itself being renamed "White Star Line Canadian Service". The company concentrated on the UK-Canada passenger trade.

The line sailed from Port of Liverpool and several ports on the American and Canadian east coasts, namely Montreal, Quebec City, Halifax, Portland and Boston.

From 1926 to 1992, the company was operated as a regional subsidiary of the United States Lines. In 1992, Dominion Navigation Company Limited (as it had been renamed in 1991) demerged from the United States Lines which was ceasing all service operations.

In 1993, the distinctive blue and white burgee with the golden crowned dolphin was designed and has remained in use ever since, replacing the United States Lines burgee.

Dominion Navigation Company has since been in private ownership, headquartered in Montserrat, British West Indies, incorporated as a private company limited by shares. Dominion Navigation Company, sometimes operating as Dominion Cruises™, specialized on private luxury cruises in the West Indies and yacht charter in the Caribbean islands. In addition to its presence in the West Indies, the company expanded its operations in Europe with bespoke luxury cruises on the French Riviera, Monaco and the Italian Riviera in 2017.

References

External links 
Dominion Navigation Company Limited' official website
Dominion Line History and Ephemera GG Archives
White Star-Dominion Line History and Ephemera GG Archives

Defunct shipping companies of the United Kingdom
Transport companies established in 1870
Transport companies disestablished in 1902
History of the Atlantic Ocean
Defunct companies based in Liverpool
Transatlantic shipping companies
Liverpool and Mississippi Steamship Co.